The Joy Cowley Award was established by Storylines Children's Literature Foundation of New Zealand in 2002 to honour the outstanding contribution to children's literature by Joy Cowley.

The Award is for a picture book manuscript, of no more than 1000 words, for children 0–7 or 7–13 years and is awarded annually, when merited. It consists of an award of NZ$1500 with an offer of publication by Scholastic New Zealand.

Entries close 31 October each year. The award is announced each year in March and the book published the following year. The entrants must be residents of New Zealand.

External links

New Zealand children's literary awards
Awards established in 2003
2003 establishments in New Zealand